Potamo may refer to:

 Potamo of Alexandria, eclectic philosopher
 Potamo of Mytilene, rhetorician